Dagger Beach is the ninth album by American singer-songwriter John Vanderslice.  It was self-released on June 11, 2013, financed by a Kickstarter campaign.

Track listing 
All songs written and composed by John Vanderslice except "Song For the Landlords of Tiny Telephone" written by Shawn Alpay and "interlude 2" by Rob Shelton.

 "Raw Wood" (3:18)
 "Harlequin Press" (3:27)
 "Song For Dana Lok" (2:21)
 "How The West Was Won" (3:48)
 "Interlude #1" (2:12)
 "Song For David Berman" (4:54)
 "Damage Control" (4:22)
 "Song For The Landlords Of Tiny Telephone" (1:32)
 "Gaslight" (2:45)
 "Sleep It Off" (2:43)
 "Sonogram" (2:25)
 "North Coast Rep" (4:05)
 "Interlude #2" (:47)

References 

2013 albums
John Vanderslice albums
Kickstarter-funded albums
Crowdfunded albums